Events from the year 1929 in Argentina

Incumbents
 President: Hipólito Yrigoyen
 Vice president: Enrique Martínez

Governors
 Buenos Aires Province: Valentin Vergara 
 Cordoba: José Antonio Ceballos 
 Mendoza Province: Carlos A. Borzani

Vice Governors
 Buenos Aires Province: Victoriano de Ortúzar

Events
1 June – The 1st Conference of the Communist Parties of Latin America opens in Buenos Aires.

Births
1 February – Basilio Lami Dozo, dictator (died 2017)
17 February – Omar Monza, Argentine basketball player (died 2017)
11 June – Antonio Pujía, Argentine sculptor (died 2018)
14 October – Norbert Gastell, actor (died 2015)

Deaths
19 October – Antonio Bermejo, judge, lawyer and politician (born 1853)

References

 
Years of the 20th century in Argentina